Statistics of the French Amateur Football Championship in the 1927-28 season.

Excellence Division

Overview
Stade Français won the championship.

Quarterfinals
SO Montpellier 3-2 Stade Havrais

Semifinals
Stade Français 6-2 SO Montpellier

Honour Division
FC Mulhouse won the championship.

References
RSSF

French Amateur Football Championship
France
1927–28 in French football